Kaarlo Nuorvala (formerly Nylenius; 28 June 1910 − 24 June 1967) was a Finnish writer, screenwriter and director who also made a few appearances in films as an actor. He occasionally used pseudonyms Reino Arras, Hilkka Helovuo and Kalle Kivipää.

Nuorvala wrote several adventure novels, detective novels and books for girls. Some of those were written under pseudonyms Bob Palmer, Roy Milton, Max Dugan and Earl Kennington. Nuorvala was most prolific in the 1940s. In 1945 alone, 27 books were published.

He was the editor-in-chief of the Finnish National Socialist Labor Organisation's magazine for a while in the summer of 1942.

As an actor 

 Suomalaistyttöjä Tukholmassa (1952)
 Kolmiapila (1953)
 Viettelysten tie (1955)
 Kultainen vasikka (1961)

Selected screenplays 

 Tukkijoella — 1951
 The Millionaire Recruit (Finnish: Miljonäärimonni) — 1953
 Alaston malli karkuteillä — 1953
 Vääpelin kauhu — 1957
 Gas, Inspector Palmu! (Finnish: Kaasua, komisario Palmu!) — 1961
 The Stars Will Tell, Inspector Palmu (Finnish: Tähdet kertovat, komisario Palmu) — 1962

References

External links 
 

1910 births
1967 deaths
Mass media people from Vyborg
People from Viipuri Province (Grand Duchy of Finland)
Writers from Vyborg
Finnish screenwriters
Finnish film directors
20th-century screenwriters